The Arden Way is waymarked by the Heart of England Way Association and forms a circular walk to be enjoyed with the rest of Heart of England Way and the European route E2.

Rural in character, the route traces old paths and routes through the ancient Forest of Arden, Warwickshire.
More information is also given on the newly added ( March 2008 ) web pages for The Arden Way by the Heart of England Way Association.

External links 
Arden Way website

Arden Way
Arden Way
Protected areas of Warwickshire